Nazok, also rendered as Nazik or Nasik, may refer to:
 Nazok-e Olya
 Nazok-e Sofla